Chiva is a municipality in the comarca of Hoya de Buñol in the Valencian Community, Spain.

References

Municipalities in the Province of Valencia
Hoya de Buñol